Ana Denicola, Ph.D (born 30 September 1959), is an Uruguayan pharmacist and chemical researcher and professor Science Faculty at the University of the Uruguayan Republic, from 2005 to 2010 she was head of the head of faculty there. She also works as a researcher in the Basic Sciences Developmental Program (PEDECIBA) and the National Research System of the Uruguayan Agency of Research and Innovation. From 2000 to 2002, Denicola was president of the Uruguayan Society for the Biosciences.

Denicola possesses a master's degree in chemistry from the University of the Uruguayan Republic and a Ph.D. in biochemistry from Virginia Tech in 1989. Her field of research is the characterization of kinetic and physicochemical free radicals produced in vivo, particularly in oxygen and nitrogen. She has over 60 published articles. Currently, she is a research director at the University of the Uruguayan Republic.

Citations

External links

Living people
1959 births
Uruguayan scientists
Uruguayan women scientists